William R. McAndrew (September 7, 1914-May 30, 1968) was the director of NBC News from 1951 until his death in 1968.

McAndrew was born in Washington, D.C. in 1914, and started in journalism by becoming a part-time reporter for The Washington Herald in 1935 just before graduating from Catholic University.  He was with UPI for two years and then joined NBC News.  In 1942 he joined the Board of Economic Warfare of six months, and then joined ABC News for 18 months before returning to NBC.  In 1951 he became the manager of network news and oversaw the network's news under growing titles, becoming "president" of NBC News in 1965.

McAndrew was a leader in the development of television journalism.  He created The Huntley–Brinkley Report, using two anchors located in different cities.  He won a Peabody Award in 1962, a Personal Award for his "vision and leadership" as NBC News' Executive Vice-President.

He died at age 53 a few days after being injured in a fall, survived by his wife,Carmody, John (29 March 1989). The TV Column, The Washington Post (mention of death of widow Irene in 1989 at age 74) three children, and three grandchildren.  His daughter Mary also became a journalist, and son William (Bill) Jr. worked in media relations at NBC News for many years.

References

1914 births
1968 deaths
20th-century American journalists
NBCUniversal people
Presidents of NBC News
Catholic University of America alumni